John Gardiner may refer to:

John Gardiner, Baron Gardiner of Kimble (born 1956), British peer
John Sylvester John Gardiner (1765–1830), Rector of Trinity Church, Boston, Massachusetts
John Gardiner (Australia) (1798–1878), banker and grazier
John Gardiner (basketball) (1943–2014), Australian Olympic basketball player
John Gardiner (businessman) (born 1936), British businessman
John Gardiner (footballer, born 1911) (1911–1965), Scottish footballer, played for Great Britain in 1936 Olympics
John Gardiner (footballer, born 1958), Scottish footballer
John Gardiner (hurler) (born 1983), hurler with Cork GAA
Sir John Eliot Gardiner (born 1943), British conductor
John Reynolds Gardiner (1944–2006), American children's author
John Gardiner (Montreal politician), former politician in Montreal, Quebec, Canada
John Stanley Gardiner (1872–1946), British zoologist
John Gardiner (died 1586) (1525–1586), MP for Penryn and Dorchester
John Gardiner (cricketer) (1810–?), English cricketer
John Rolfe Gardiner (born 1936), American author
John Gardiner (painter), see Charles Tupper
Harry Gardiner (politician) (John Henry Gardiner, 1907–1974), Australian politician

See also
John Gardner (disambiguation)
John Gardener (disambiguation)